Sideridis rosea, the rosewing, is a species of cutworm or dart moth in the family Noctuidae. It is found in North America.

References

Further reading

 
 
 

Hadenini
Articles created by Qbugbot
Moths described in 1874